Hawsehole is a nautical term for a small hole in the hull of a ship through which hawsers may be passed. It is also known as a cat hole. In the (British) Royal Navy, a man who had risen from the lowest grade to officer was said to have "come in at the hawsehole".

See also
Hawsepiper

References

Shipbuilding
Sailboat components
Sailing ship components
Nautical terminology